Maya of the Seven Veils or The Veiled Lady is a 1951 West German musical film directed by Géza von Cziffra and starring Maria Litto, Willy Fritsch and Rudolf Platte.

It was shot at the Wandsbek Studios in Hamburg. The film's sets were designed by the art director Herbert Kirchhoff.

Partial cast
 Maria Litto as Maja Club's dancing star
 Willy Fritsch
 Rudolf Platte
 Grethe Weiser
 Käthe Haack
 Rudolf Vogel
 Oskar Sima
 Ernst Waldow
 Iska Geri as Singer
 Jockel Stahl as Dancer
 Anneliese Rothenberger as Singer
 Peter Schütte as Singer
 Evelyn Künneke as Singer
 Gerhard Wendland as Singer
 Joachim Wolff as Singer
 Margarete Slezak as Eine Dame mit Schmuck

References

Bibliography

External links 
 

1951 films
1951 musical films
German musical films
West German films
1950s German-language films
Films directed by Géza von Cziffra
Films shot at Wandsbek Studios
1950s German films